Zavalla High School is a public high school located in Zavalla, Texas (USA) and classified as a 2A school by the UIL. It is part of the Zavalla Independent School District located in southern Angelina County. In 2015, the school was rated "Met Standard" by the Texas Education Agency.

Athletics
The Zavalla Eagles compete in these sports - 

Baseball
Basketball
Cross Country
Softball
Track and Field

References

External links
 Zavalla ISD

Schools in Angelina County, Texas
Public high schools in Texas
Public middle schools in Texas